Lorenzo Washington (December 2, 1986 – February 14, 2021) was an American professional football player who was a defensive end in the National Football League (NFL). He was signed by the Dallas Cowboys as an undrafted free agent in 2010. He played college football at Alabama.

He was also a member of the New England Patriots, New York Jets and Detroit Lions.

College career
A native of Loganville, Georgia, Washington attended Grayson High School before enrolling at the University of Alabama.  In August 2008, head coach Nick Saban moved him from nose tackle to defensive end.  Washington was a member of Alabama's 2009 national championship team.

Professional career

Dallas Cowboys
After going undrafted in the 2010 NFL Draft, Washington signed with the Dallas Cowboys on April 25, 2010. He was released on July 29, 2010 after a hamstring injury prevented Washington from practicing with the team.

New England Patriots
Washington was signed to the New England Patriots' practice squad on November 3, 2010. He was released on January 3, 2011.

New York Jets
Washington was signed by the New York Jets to a future contract on January 26, 2011. He was waived on September 2.

Detroit Lions
On September 2, 2012, the Detroit Lions signed Washington to their practice squad.

Death
Washington died in his Dallas home of suspected carbon monoxide poisoning on February 14, 2021, aged 34.

References

External links
Alabama Crimson Tide bio
ESPN.com bio
New York Jets bio

1986 births
2021 deaths
People from Loganville, Georgia
Sportspeople from the Atlanta metropolitan area
Players of American football from Georgia (U.S. state)
American football defensive ends
Alabama Crimson Tide football players
Dallas Cowboys players
New England Patriots players
New York Jets players
Deaths from carbon monoxide poisoning
Accidental deaths in Texas